Jennifer Stoller (26 April 1946 – 18 November 2018) was a British actress. In a career spanning almost 40 years, she appeared in TV, film, stage and radio productions.

Early life
Stoller was born in Finchley, north London, to Jewish parents. Her father, Sam Stoller, was a fishmonger, of Russian and Lithuanian descent, and her mother Ada (née Pottersman), was from Łódź, Poland. Stoller attended La Sagesse, a Catholic convent school, in Golders Green. After completing high school, Stoller attended the Drama Centre theatre school in London, however in 1966 she was asked to leave as she was not considered suitable for group dramatic work.

Career
Following her training at the Drama Centre, Stoller worked in repertory theatre for a number of years, and in theatre-in-education groups. In 1971 she joined Nancy Meckler’s Freehold company. Meckler was an American director and Stoller appeared in a number of new works, including works by American Sam Shepard. Stoller was also a member of the Royal Shakespeare Company in the 1970s, playing Helena in the 1972 world tour of Peter Brook’s production of A Midsummer Night’s Dream, and was later a founding member of its offshoot company Joint Stock. She also performed with the Royal Court Theatre and the National Theatre of England. In 1983 she performed in New York City as part of the New York Shakespeare Festival.

In 2009 Stoller performed in Caryl Churchill's play Seven Jewish Children at the Royal Court Theatre. The BBC refused to broadcast the play on radio due to its political nature; in response, The Guardian hired theatre director Elliot Smith to produce a version of the play that could be shared on its website, and Stoller performed the play as a monologue.

Stoller was a member of the BBC Radio Drama Company and appeared in over 100 radio broadcasts. She also appeared in television series, notably in the role of Annabelle Harborough in the 1981 series Sapphire & Steel, and a small number of films. In her later years, Stoller taught and directed theatre productions for London theatre schools.

Death
Stoller died in London on 18 November 2018 of cancer. She was 72 years old.

Stage appearances

Television appearances

Film appearances

Radio appearances

References

1946 births
2018 deaths
People from Finchley
Royal Shakespeare Company members
Alumni of the Drama Centre London
British people of Russian-Jewish descent
British people of Lithuanian-Jewish descent
British people of Polish-Jewish descent
20th-century British actresses
21st-century British actresses
Actresses from London
British film actresses
British radio actresses
British stage actresses
British television actresses
Jewish British actresses